Julie Jane Bradbury (born 12 February 1967) is a former English badminton player who represented Great Britain at the 1992 and 1996 Olympic Games. She was part of the national mixed team that won the gold medal at the 1994 Commonwealth Games, also captured the silver medals in the mixed and women's doubles events.  Along with those sporting achievements she is only the second person to hold all five titles in all three disciplines of badminton (singles, doubles, and mixed) at the English National Championships. She reached a career high as world No. 1 in the mixed doubles and No. 4 in the women's doubles.

Career

1992 Summer Olympics
Bradbury competed in badminton at the 1992 Summer Olympics in women's doubles with Gillian Clark. In the first round they beat Erma Sulistianingsih and Rosiana Tendean of Indonesia and in the second round Katrin Schmidt and Kerstin Ubben of Germany. In the quarterfinals they were beaten by the eventual gold medalists, Hwang Hye-young and Chung So-young of Korea, 5–15, 5–15.

1996 Summer Olympics
Bradbury competed in badminton at the 1996 Summer Olympics in the mixed and women's doubles events. Teamed-up with Joanne Goode, they had a bye in the first round, but was defeated by Ann Jørgensen and Lotte Olsen of Denmark 4–15, 5–15 in the second round. In the mixed doubles event, she and Simon Archer were eliminated in the early rounds to Indonesian pair Flandy Limpele and Rosalina Riseu.

Achievements

World Cup 
Women's doubles

Commonwealth Games 
Women's doubles

Mixed doubles

European Championships 
Women's doubles

Mixed doubles

IBF World Grand Prix
The World Badminton Grand Prix sanctioned by International Badminton Federation (IBF) since 1983.

Women's doubles

Mixed doubles

IBF International 
Women's singles

Women's doubles

References

External links 
 
British Olympic Association > Julie Bradbury

Living people
1967 births
Sportspeople from Oxford
English female badminton players
Badminton players at the 1992 Summer Olympics
Badminton players at the 1996 Summer Olympics
Olympic badminton players of Great Britain
Badminton players at the 1994 Commonwealth Games
Commonwealth Games gold medallists for England
Commonwealth Games silver medallists for England
Commonwealth Games medallists in badminton
World No. 1 badminton players
Medallists at the 1994 Commonwealth Games